The 2013 Dartmouth Big Green football team represented Dartmouth College in the 2013 NCAA Division I FCS football season. The Big Green were led by head coach Buddy Teevens in his ninth straight year and 14th overall and played their home games at Memorial Field. They were a member of the Ivy League. Dartmouth averaged 6,243 fans per game. They finished with a record of 6–4 overall and 5–2 in Ivy League play to place third.

Schedule

References

Dartmouth
Dartmouth Big Green football seasons
Dartmouth Big Green football